Bulbophyllum aggregatum is a species of orchid in the genus Bulbophyllum.

References

The Bulbophyllum-Checklist
The Internet Orchid Species Photo Encyclopedia

External links 
 
 

aggregatum
Plants described in 1965